Thomas Joyner could refer to: 

Tom Joyner (born 1949), American radio host
Tom Joyner (writer), American comic book writer and academic

See also
Thomas Joiner (born 1965), American psychologist